Kaeng Suea Ten railway station is a railway station located in Nong Bua Subdistrict, Phatthana Nikhom District, Lopburi Province.

References 

Railway stations in Thailand
Lopburi province